Hayet Sassi (born 24 October 1982) is a Tunisian former weightlifter, competing in the 63 kg category and representing Tunisia at international competitions. 

She participated at the 2004 Summer Olympics in the 63 kg event. He set three Tunisian records in Olympic weightlifting: 95 kg in the snatch, 120 kg in the clean & jerk and a total of 215.0 kg.

Major results

References

External links
 
 
 
 
 http://fr.allafrica.com/stories/200406010528.html
 http://www.gettyimages.ae/photos/hayet-sassi?excludenudity=true&sort=mostpopular&mediatype=photography&phrase=hayet%20sassi

1982 births
Living people
Tunisian female weightlifters
Weightlifters at the 2004 Summer Olympics
Olympic weightlifters of Tunisia
Place of birth missing (living people)